James J. Coleman (born May 15, 1950 in Chicago, IL) is an electrical engineer who worked at Bell Labs, Rockwell International, and the University of Illinois, Urbana. He is best known for his work on semiconductor lasers, materials and devices including strained-layer indium gallium arsenide lasers and selective area epitaxy. Coleman is a Fellow of the IEEE and a member of the US National Academy of Engineering.

Career 
James J. Coleman was born in the Garfield Ridge neighborhood of Chicago, Illinois and went to St. Daniel the Prophet elementary school and St. Laurence high school. He was the eldest son of Harry A. Coleman and Lorita M. Kelly. He studied electrical engineering at the University of Illinois, Urbana graduating with a BSEE in 1972. He stayed on at Illinois and was granted an MSEE in 1973 under the direction of O.L. Gaddy. Continuing at Illinois he did his PhD research under the direction of Nick Holonyak, writing a thesis on room temperature visible semiconductor diode lasers. He received his PhD from Illinois in 1975.

Coleman joined Bell Labs, Murray Hill in 1976, where his initial assignment was in the Materials Science Research Department under the direction of Morton B. Panish. His work there involved contributions to the development of 1.3 μm InGaAsP CW room temperature diode telecommunications lasers grown by liquid phase epitaxy (LPE). In 1978, he went to Rockwell International, Anaheim to work with P. Daniel Dapkus on metalorganic chemical vapor deposition (MOCVD), which has become a major process in the manufacture of compound semiconductor devices. They made use of this process to study MOCVD-grown heteroface AlGaAs solar cells, low-threshold single mode AlGaAs-GaAs double heterostructure lasers and quantum well heterostructure laser devices.

In 1982, he returned to the University of Illinois, Urbana where he was professor of Electrical and Computer Engineering and held the Intel Alumni Endowed Chair. He and his students were the first group to define experimentally the ranges of wavelength, threshold current density, and reliability of 980 nm strained-layer InGaAs lasers. They reported high performance narrow linewidth DBR lasers, integrated lasers and other photonic devices by selective-area epitaxy, and detailed the growth processes for patterned quantum dot lasers.

Coleman directed more than twenty-nine PhD thesis students at Illinois, most of who took their first jobs in industry.  He was named to the List of Teachers Ranked as Excellent twelve times. He is presently the Intel Alumni Endowed Chair Emeritus in Electrical and Computer Engineering.

In 2013, he joined the University of Texas at Dallas as the Erik Jonsson School Distinguished Chair in Electrical Engineering.

Coleman has had significant involvement in the publications, conference, and leadership activities of the major professional societies associated with the field of photonics (IEEE, OSA, SPIE, APS, and AAAS). He has served the IEEE Photonics Society (formerly the IEEE Lasers and Electro-Optics Society) as an Associate Editor of IEEE Photonics Technology Letters (9 years), a Distinguished Lecturer, an elected member of the Board of Governors, and as Vice-President for Publications. He completed a five-year commitment to the leadership of the society having served as President-Elect, President and Past-President. The society awarded him the Distinguished Service Award in 2008.

Honors 
 Member, National Academy of Engineering (2012) for contributions to semiconductor lasers and photonic materials.
 Fellow, National Academy of Inventors (2014)
 John Tyndall Award, IEEE Photonics Society and Optical Society of America (2013)
 SPIE Technical Achievement Award (2011) "for contributions to the methods, designs, and demonstrations of selectivity grown discrete and monolithically integrated compound semiconductor lasers and photonic devices"
 IEEE David Sarnoff Award (2008) "for leadership in the development of highly reliable strained-layer lasers"
 Nick Holonyak, Jr. Award, Optical Society of America (2006) "for a career of contributions to quantum well and strained-layer semiconductor lasers through innovative epitaxial growth methods and novel device designs"
 ISCS Heinrich Welker Award (2004) "for the demonstration of reliable strained layer lasers leading to 980 nm Er fiber pumps"
 William Streifer Scientific Achievement Award, IEEE Lasers and Electro-Optics Society (2000) "for pioneering research in high reliability strained layer semiconductor lasers"

References 

1950 births
Living people
American electrical engineers
Scientists from Chicago
Grainger College of Engineering alumni
Scientists at Bell Labs
University of Illinois Urbana-Champaign faculty
University of Texas at Dallas faculty
Fellows of Optica (society)
Fellow Members of the IEEE
Fellows of the American Association for the Advancement of Science
Fellows of the American Physical Society
Members of the United States National Academy of Engineering
Engineers from Illinois